Lina Meruane Boza (born 1970) is a Chilean writer and professor. Her work, written in Spanish, has been translated into English, Italian, Portuguese, German, and French. In 2011 she won the Anna Seghers-Preis for the quality of her work, and in 2012 the Sor Juana Inés de la Cruz Prize for her novel Sangre en el ojo.

Biography
Born in Santiago, Chile, Lina Meruane is of Palestinian and Italian descent. She is the niece of actress Nelly Meruane and comedian . She started writing as a storyteller and cultural journalist. The following year she published Las infantas, a book that received a very positive critique from Chilean reviewers, as well as writer Roberto Bolaño:

Meruane published two novels before leaving for New York to do her doctorate studies in Spanish-American literature at New York University. In the United States she received a fellowship from the Guggenheim Foundation in 2004 (for the novel Fruta Podrida), and another in 2010 from the National Endowment for the Arts (for Sangre en el ojo). In 2011 she received the Anna Seghers-Preis, and the following year she won the 20th Sor Juana Inés de la Cruz Award for Sangre en el ojo, during the Guadalajara International Book Fair, with a jury made up of the writers Yolanda Arroyo Pizarro, Antonio Ortuño, and Cristina Rivera Garza.

She currently teaches Latin American literature and cultures at New York University. She was the founder and director of the independent label Brutas Editoras, which published books from Santiago and Manhattan.

Works

Short stories
 Las infantas, Planeta, Santiago, Chile, 1998 (Eterna Cadencia, Argentina, 2010),

Novels translated into English
Seeing Red translated by Megan McDowell, Deep Vellum, USA (Atlantic Books, UK, 2016), ; original edition Sangre en el ojo 
Nervous System translated by Megan McDowell, forthcoming, Graywolf, USA, 2021 (Atlantic Books, UK, 2021); original edition Sistema Nervioso

Novels in original Spanish
 Póstuma, Planeta, Santiago, 2000 (Oficina Do Livro, Portugal, 2001)
 Cercada, Cuarto Propio, Santiago, 2000 (Cuneta Editores, Santiago, 2014 with prologue by Lorena Amaro)
 Fruta podrida, Fondo de Cultura Económica, Santiago, 2007 (Eterna Cadencia, 2015), 
 Sangre en el ojo, Caballo de Troya, Spain, 2012 (Penguin Random House, 2015) 
 Sistema Nervioso, Penguin Random House, Chile & Spain, 2019

Drama
 Un lugar donde caerse muerta / Not a leg to stand on, dramatic adaptation of the novel Fruta podrida by the author and the Chilean theater director Martín Balmaceda; bilingual edition with prologue by Guillermo Calderón and English translation by Sarah Thomas, Diaz Grey Editores, 2012 (Trópico Sur, Uruguay, 2013)

Nonfiction
 Viral Voyages. Tracing AIDS in Latin America, translated by Andrea Rosenberg, Palgrave MacMillan, 2014, ; original edition Viajes virales: la crisis del contagio global en la escritura del sida, essay, Fondo de Cultura Económica, Santiago 2012, 
 Volverse palestina, chronicle, Literal Publishing, USA / Conaculta, Mexico, 2013, 
 Volverse palestina/Volvernos otros, chronicle/personal essay; Literatura Random House, Santiago, 2014 
 Contra los hijos, essay-diatribe, Tumbona, Mexico, 2014,  and Penguin Random House, 2018

Visual essays
 Cinco personas en busca de su personaje, ongoing project, first part directed by Luciano Piazza

In English language journals 
Two Lines (California), Bomb (New York), The Literary Review (New York), Brick (Canada), N+1 (New York), Words without Borders (New York), Drunken Boat (US), The White Review (UK), Litro Magazine (UK), Brown Book (Arab Emirates), Asymptote (US), among others in several languages.

Grants and awards
 1997: Grant. National Council for the Arts, FONDART, Chile, for Las Infantas (National Council of Culture and the Arts)
 2004: Grant. John Simon Guggenheim Foundation. Latin American and Caribbean Fellowship for Fruta podrida
 2006: Award. Best Unpublished Novel, for Fruta podrida (National Council of Culture and the Arts)
 2010: Grant. National Endowment for the Arts, NEA, for Seeing Red.  
 2011: Award. Anna Seghers-Preis, por her literary work 
 2012: Award. Sor Juana Inés de la Cruz Prize, for Sangre en el ojo
 2015: Award. Institute of Chilean-Arab Culture Award, for Volverse Palestina
 2015: Award. Cálamo Another Look, for Fruta podrida (Zaragoza)
 2017: Grant. Artists-in-Berlin Program, Deutscher Akademischer Austauschdienst DAAD (German Academic Exchange Service; for Sistema Nervioso.

References

1970 births
20th-century Chilean women writers
21st-century Chilean women writers
Chilean educators
Chilean women educators
21st-century Chilean novelists
Chilean people of Italian descent
Chilean people of Palestinian descent
20th-century Chilean short story writers
Chilean women short story writers
Living people
New York University alumni
New York University faculty
National Endowment for the Arts Fellows
Writers from Santiago
Chilean expatriates in the United States
Chilean women novelists